Wildflower Preserve is an 80-acre preserve located on the Cape Haze peninsula in Charlotte County, Florida. It was formerly used as a golf course. The property includes upland habitats and fresh water ponds that feed into Lemon Creek and on to Lemon Bay.

References

Protected areas of Charlotte County, Florida
Nature reserves in Florida